Public Gardens also known as Bagh-e-Aam is a historic park located in the heart of the city of Hyderabad, India. It was built in 1846 by the 7th Nizam of Hyderabad and is the oldest park in Hyderabad.

History
Public Gardens also known as Bagh-e-Aam (Bagheaam) or Bagham. In Urdu "Bagh" means Garden and Aam or "Aam Jana" means "the public" was built in 1846. during the period of the Nizam's. Post-1980 it started being called as Public Gardens.

Attractions
The Telangana State Archaeology Museum, Potti Sriramulu Telugu University, a well known open-air theater "Lalitha Kala Toranam", "Jawahar Bal Bhavan", The Telangana Legislative Assembly and Legislative council buildings are located here. Even today people use this as a recreation park. It is located at Nampally.

A visit to the Telangana State Archaeology Museum is a delight for art lovers. Located in the picturesque Public Gardens, the museum boasts of one of the richest repositories of antiques and art objects in the country. Built in 1920 by the Nizam VII, the museum building itself is a fine example of Indo-Saracenic architecture. The museum contains a Buddhist gallery, Brahmanical & Jain gallery, Bronze gallery, Arms & Armour gallery, Numismatics gallery, Ajanta gallery and more. Adjacent to the State Museum is the Contemporary Art Museum.

Landmarks
Public Gardens is home to some major landmarks in Hyderabad like the Telangana Legislative Assembly, Jubilee Hall, AP State Archaeology Museum, Indira Priyadarshini Auditorium, Asif Tennis Club, Lalita Kala Thoranam, Jawahar Bal Bhavan, and Shahi Masjid are located inside this park.

See also

Nizams of Hyderabad
6th Nizam - Mir Mahbub Ali Khan
7th Nizam - Mir Osman Ali Khan

References

Parks in Hyderabad, India
Establishments in Hyderabad State